The Klaudia Taev Competition is a competition for young opera singers. It is the main event of the Pärnu Opera Music Festival PromFest. The Competition has been named after a local legendary singing teacher Klaudia Taev. The first Competition was held in the year 1996 and since 2001 it takes place biannually. 

The main prize of the competition is the proposal to sing the main opera role in opera production, which is selected at the request of the winner of the competition. 

Among others Barbara Hendricks, Edda Moser, Dolora Zajick, Yevgeny Nesterenko, Teresa Żylis-Gara, Ileana Cotrubas, Karan Armstrong, Luana DeVol, Cynthia Makris, Sergei Leiferkus and Irina Arkhipova have been the jury members of the Klaudia Taev Competition.

Prize winners

Opera productions

References

External links
Klaudia Taev Competition

Opera competitions
Opera in Estonia